The Great Sequoia was an individual sequoia tree located in Vitoria-Gasteiz, the capital city of the Basque Country, and was a symbol of the city because of its enormous dimensions. It was declared as an individual tree by Decree 265, on 16 May 1995, and died in 2014.

Location and measurements
The tree measured 40 meters of height, 8 meters of circumference of trunk and 16 meters of crown. It was located in the back court of a public building at Magdalena street Nº12, close to Urkide's college and 200 meters from the Florida. It was the oldest living being of Vitoria-Gasteiz until 2014, having been planted in 1860 by D. Juan Ibarrondo. It was one of the "Colossuses of Vitoria".

Endangerment and protection

The monumental sequoia of Vitoria-Gasteiz is surrounded by walls and buildings, bordering the court of the college. The construction of the nearby block of housings damaged its roots, and deprived the tree of light. Because it was close to a school, some children's games contributed to trampling the soil. At one point, it was to be felled because its dimensions were perceived as a nuisance, but the Town Hall ruled that the sequoia was not to be cut down. When the tree's leaves started yellowing, the sequoia's condition started to become worrisome because some of the sequoias located on the Campillo de Deleitosa had been dying during the recent several years.

Subsequently, actions tending to protect the tree and to create a suitable environment for it began. The initial project was modified attending to the suggestions of the Deputation, competent in the management of the singular trees in Alava. A few wooden platforms were built to help aerate the soil, preventing visitors from walking through it. The rest of the space, most of the garden, was covered by plant remains to further prevent walking upon the soil.

See also
 Sequoia National Forest
 Sequoiadendron giganteum
 List of individual trees

References

Individual trees in Spain
Vitoria-Gasteiz